The UEFA European Under-18 Championship 1998 Final Tournament was held in Cyprus. It also served as the European qualification for the 1999 FIFA World Youth Championship.

Qualification

50 UEFA nations entered the competition, and with the hosts Cyprus qualifying automatically, the other 49 teams competed in the qualifying competition to determine the remaining seven spots in the final tournament. The qualifying competition consisted of two rounds: First round, which took place in autumn 1997 and was played in 14 round-robin tournament groups with three or four teams each; and the Second round, which took place in spring 1998, in which pairs of group winners played home and away matches.

The following teams qualified for the final tournament.

 1 = as West Germany
 2 = as East Germany

Match officials
A total of 6 referees, 7 assistant referees and 2 fourth officials officiated the tournament.

Referees
 Pascal Garibian
 Valentin Ivanov
 Eric Romain
 Adrian Stoica
 Jan Wegereef
 Emanuel Raphael Zammit

Assistant referees
 Astrit Dervishi
 Ramiz Asadov
 Jiří Vodička
 Adolfs Supe
 Michael Argyrou
 Stavrou Stavros
 Antonis Papanayotou

Fourth officials
 Michael Karaiskakis
 Yiannakis Kyprianides

Squads

Each national team submitted a squad of 18 players, including two goalkeepers.

Group stage

Group A

Group B

Third place match

Final

Qualification to World Youth Championship
The six best performing teams qualified for the 1999 FIFA World Youth Championship.

Goalscorers

See also
 1998 UEFA European Under-18 Championship qualifying

External links
Overview by UEFA.com
Results by RSSSF

1998
1997–98 in European football
1998
1997–98 in Cypriot football
1997–98 in Republic of Ireland association football
1997–98 in German football
1997–98 in Portuguese football
1998 in Lithuanian football
1997–98 in Croatian football
1997–98 in English football
1997–98 in Spanish football
July 1998 sports events in Europe
1998 in youth association football